"Hey Mama" is the debut single by EXO-CBX, the first official sub-unit of the South Korean boy group EXO. It was released on October 31, 2016 by S.M. Entertainment as the title track of their debut extended play Hey Mama!. The Japanese version of the song was released on May 24, 2017 along with their Japanese debut EP Girls.

Background and release 
"Hey Mama!" ("Mama" referring to an attractive woman) is described as a "funk-pop" track with retro style to it. The lyrics talk about enjoying parties to make it a special day. It was officially released on October 31, 2016.

"Hey Mama!" was choreographed by Kyle Hanagami, who had previously choreographed for Girls' Generation, After School, Red Velvet, and Blackpink. Its music video garnered 2 million views on YouTube within 9 hours after being released.

Music video 
On October 25, 2016 a teaser for "Hey Mama!" music video was revealed by S.M. Entertainment. The music video was officially released on October 31, 2016.

The first part of the music video was Chen and Xiumin working in their tiny cubicles while Baekhyun is on the roof. He influenced the two to stop working and enjoy themselves. Then, they invaded a news room influencing more people to stop working. In the end, the members, along with some other working people are in the forest, camping, enjoying themselves. It also features backup dancers where they perform the choreography of the song with the trio in some scenes.

Promotions 
EXO-CBX performed "Hey Mama!" live for the first time at the promotional event for their debut EP Hey Mama! on October 31, 2016.

EXO-CBX made their debut performance of "Hey Mama!" on M! Countdown on November 3, later on  KBS's Music Bank and MBC's Show! Music Core.

On November 5, 2016, EXO-CBX performed "Hey Mama!" at You Hee-yeol's Sketchbook.

On November 18, 2016, the group performed the song at the OGN World Championship N-Pop Showcase.

On February 18, 2017, EXO-CBX performed "Hey Mama!" at the K-Drama Fest in Pyeongchang.

The group performed the Japanese version of "Hey Mama!" for the first time at the 2017 Girls Awards on May 3, 2017.

EXO-CBX performed "Hey Mama!" on Music Bank on May 19, 2017 in Jeonju in honor of FIFA U-20 World Cup.

On June 7, the group performed "Hey Mama!", the Japanese version on EXO-CBX "Colorful BoX" Free Showcase.

On August 26, 2017, EXO-CBX performed the Japanese version of "Hey Mama!" on a-nation concert in Japan.

Reception 
The song reached the top of six South Korean real-time music charts shortly after its release, with the other songs following behind. It also reached number one on the iTunes charts in 7 countries, including South Korea, Peru, Singapore, Thailand, the Philippines, Hong Kong and Brunei, as well as number two in Taiwan and Indonesia.

"Hey Mama!" ranked No.4 on Gaon Digital Chart, and No.7 on Billboard's US World Digital Songs.

Charts

Sales

Accolades

Music programs

Release history

References 

2016 songs
2016 singles
Korean-language songs
SM Entertainment singles
Exo-CBX songs